Zope Public License is a free software license, used primarily for the Zope application server software. The license is similar to the well-known BSD license, however the ZPL also adds clauses prohibiting trademark use and requiring documentation of all changes.

External links

Zope Public License v2.0 at the Open Source Initiative
Zope Public License v2.1 at the Free Software Foundation
Zope Public License v2.1 at the Zope Foundation

References

Free and open-source software licenses
Zope